Sestanovich is a surname. Notable people with the surname include:

Ashley Sestanovich (born 1981), English footballer
Stephen Sestanovich (born 1950), American government official, academic, and author

Slavic-language surnames